Stephen Atherton (born 17 March 1965) is a South African former rugby union player.

Playing career
Atherton represented the Natal Schools team, together with players such as Gary Teichmann and Joel Stransky, at the annual Craven Week in 1984 held in Bloemfontein. He made his debut for the Natal senior side in 1988 and played 165 matches for Natal over a thirteen-year period and was a member of the Currie Cup winning teams in 1990, 1992 and 1996.

Atherton toured with the Springboks to France and England in 1992, but did not play in any test matches. He made his test debut for South Africa during the 1993 tour of Argentina, in first test on 5 November 1993 at the Ferrocarril Oeste Stadium in Buenos Aires. He played in eight tests matches and fifteen tour matches for the Springboks, scoring one try in a tour match.

Test history

See also
List of South Africa national rugby union players – Springbok no. 576

References

1965 births
Living people
Rugby union players from Gosport
Sharks (Currie Cup) players
South Africa international rugby union players
South African rugby union players
Rugby union flankers